The First World War British Cavalry Corps was formed 9 October 1914.

Command
Commander Lieutenant-General Edmund Allenby
Chief of Staff Colonel John Vaughan
Colonel G S Brigadier-General George Barrow
Brigadier-General Royal Artillery B. F. Drake

1st Cavalry Division

1st Cavalry Division commanded just two brigades until the 9th Cavalry Brigade was formed on 14 April 1915.
Major-General Beauvoir De Lisle
GSO 1 Lieutenant-Colonel A F Home

1st Cavalry Brigade
Brigadier-General Charles James Briggs
2nd Dragoon Guards (Queen's Bays)
5th (Princess Charlotte of Wales's) Dragoon Guards
11th (Prince Albert's Own) Hussars
1st Signal Troop

2nd Cavalry Brigade
Brigadier-General R L Mullens
4th (Royal Irish) Dragoon Guards
9th (Queen's Royal) Lancers
18th (Queen Mary's Own) Hussars
1/1st Queen's Own Oxfordshire Hussars from 31 October to 11 November
2nd Signal Troop

1st Division troops
VII Brigade, Royal Horse Artillery
H Battery, RHA
I Battery, RHA
VII RHA Brigade Ammunition Column
1st Field Squadron Royal Engineers
1st Signal Squadron Royal Engineers
1st Cavalry Division Supply Column Army Service Corps
1st Cavalry Field Ambulance
3rd Cavalry Field Ambulance

2nd Cavalry Division

Major-General Hubert Gough
GSO 1 Lieutenant-Colonel W H Greenly

3rd Cavalry Brigade
Brigadier-General John Vaughan
4th (Queen's Own) Hussars
5th (Royal Irish) Lancers
16th (The Queen's) Lancers
3rd Signal Troop

4th Cavalry Brigade
Brigadier-General Cecil Edward Bingham
Household Cavalry Composite Regiment  to 11 November
6th Dragoon Guards (Carabiniers)
3rd (King's Own) Hussars
1/1st Queen's Own Oxfordshire Hussars  from 11 November
4th Signal Troop

5th Cavalry Brigade
Brigadier-General Philip Chetwode
2nd Dragoons (Royal Scots Greys)
12th (Prince of Wales's Royal) Lancers
20th Hussars
5th Signal Troop

2nd Division troops
III Brigade, Royal Horse Artillery
D Battery, RHA
E Battery, RHA
J Battery, RHA
III RHA Brigade Ammunition Column
2nd Field Squadron Royal Engineers
2nd Signal Squadron Royal Engineers
2nd Cavalry Division Supply Column Army Service Corps
2nd Cavalry Field Ambulance
4th Cavalry Field Ambulance
5th Cavalry Field Ambulance

3rd Cavalry Division

Joined the Cavalry Corps 25 October
Major-General Julian Byng
GSO 1 Lieutenant-Colonel M F Gage
Commander RHA Lieutenant-Colonel C H de Rougemont

6th Cavalry Brigade
Brigadier-General Ernest Makins
3rd (Prince of Wales's) Dragoon Guards
1st (Royal) Dragoons
10th (Prince of Wales's Own Royal) Hussars to 20 November
1/1st North Somerset Yeomanry from 13 November

7th Cavalry Brigade
Brigadier-General Charles Kavanagh
1st Life Guards
2nd Life Guards
Royal Horse Guards to 20 November
1/1st Leicestershire Yeomanry from 12 November

8th Cavalry Brigade
Formed 20 November
Brigadier-General Charles Bulkeley Bulkeley-Johnson 
Royal Horse Guards
10th (Prince of Wales's Own Royal) Hussars
1/1st Essex Yeomanry from 10 December

3rd Division troops
XV Brigade, Royal Horse Artillery (later renumbered as IV Brigade, RHA)
K Battery, RHA
C Battery, RHA from 19 October
G Battery, RHA from 25 November
XV (later IV) RHA Brigade Ammunition Column
3rd Field Squadron Royal Engineers
3rd Signal Squadron Royal Engineers
3rd Cavalry Division Supply Column
6th Cavalry Field Ambulance
7th Cavalry Field Ambulance

See also
 Indian Cavalry Corps order of battle First World War

References

Bibliography
 
 

Cavalry
World War I orders of battle
Cavalry units and formations of the United Kingdom